The Port international du Cap-Haïtien is the seaport in Cap-Haïtien Haiti's second largest city.
It is operated by the government port authority Autorité Portuaire Nationale APN.

Facilities 

Two access channels leading to the Port:

Channel-West, 1 mile long, from 10 to 15 m deep, well marked by navigation aids
Channel-East, marked by tags of day (is hardly used)
Turning basin and berth wide, 11 to 18 m deep
Steering: Valid anytime
Radio: VHF Channel 16 or 12
Anchoring and quarantine: Buoy No. 1

Services offered: pilotage, mooring, storage, handling, grouping and unbundling of containers, home cruises, marina, water reservoir of 800 m³ capacity.

Quay characteristics 

There are four docks:

The platform of Cruise:

176 m long
10.5 m water depth
7 bollards

The pier-International Trade:

250 m long
9.5 m water depth
RORO ramp of 30 m wide
13 bollards
Electricity for refrigerated containers
Storage
Covered area: 2210 m²
Open area: 72,000 m², including 45,000 square meters for containers

Equipment proper handling

the platform of cabotage
100 m long
3.5 m water depth

Open-storage area of 0.5 ha

Marina:
100 m long
2.4 water depth
40 bollards available-area of 13,000 m²

Military 

The Haitian Coast Guard has one of its main base in Cap-Haïtien

References 

Nord (Haitian department)
Cap-Haitien
Cap-Haïtien